Lee Mudd (born 25 September 1981) was a professional footballer hailing from Belfast, Northern Ireland beginning his career at Stockport County at the age of 16 having been signed from Glentoran F.C. Lee had further spells with Bolton, Brighton, and also Lyon in France. The death of his father while in France forced him to take time out of the game.

References
http://www.newsletter.co.uk/sport/football/jordan-stewart-ready-to-realise-lifelong-dream-by-signing-for-swindon-town-on-friday-morning-1-6916560
http://www.newsletter.co.uk/sport/football/josh-robinson-relishing-the-challenge-after-completing-move-to-york-city-1-7437682
http://www.newtownabbeytoday.co.uk/sport/football/transfer-news-goalkeeper-brett-long-moves-to-dundee-united-1-7454048

Association footballers from Belfast
Living people
1981 births
Association footballers not categorized by position
Association football players not categorized by nationality